Elmer Edes (September 4, 1937 – February 7, 2014) was an American handball player who competed in the 1972 Summer Olympics. He was born in Budapest, Hungary. In 1972 he was part of the American team which finished 14th in the Olympic tournament. He played all five matches. He played for the Adelphi University.

References

External links
Elmer Edes' profile at Sports Reference.com
Elmer Edes' obituary

1937 births
2014 deaths
American male handball players
Olympic handball players of the United States
Handball players at the 1972 Summer Olympics
Hungarian emigrants to the United States
Sportspeople from Budapest